Valery Afanasyev (born 25 January 1945) is a Soviet sailor. He competed in the 1968 Summer Olympics.

References

1945 births
Living people
Sailors at the 1968 Summer Olympics – Dragon
Soviet male sailors (sport)
Olympic sailors of the Soviet Union
Sportspeople from Arkhangelsk